The Great Canadian Baking Show is a Canadian cooking competition television series which premiered on CBC Television on November 1, 2017. It is an adaptation of the U.K. series The Great British Bake Off, which is aired in Canada under the title The Great British Baking Show.

For its first two seasons, the show was hosted by Dan Levy and Julia Chan, with French-born Canadian chef Bruno Feldeisen and Canadian-Australian pastry chef Rochelle Adonis as judges. The third season was hosted by Aurora Browne and Carolyn Taylor, comedians and actors of Baroness von Sketch Show fame,  with Feldeisen returning as a judge joined by Canadian chef Kyla Kennaley. From the fourth season onwards, it was hosted by comedians and Second City alumni Ann Pornel and Alan Shane Lewis.

Premise
Each season of the show features 10 amateur baking contestants selected from across Canada to participate in a competition of themed baking challenges. Adapted from The Great British Bake Off, each episode features three rounds: the Signature Bake, the Technical Challenge, and the Showstopper. After the two judges taste and critique the entries, they determine which contestant is crowned each week's "Star Baker" and which contestant will be sent home.

In each season finale, the final three bakers compete to be named the winner of The Great Canadian Baking Show and take home the GCBS cake stand.

Production
Produced by Proper Television in association with the CBC and Love Productions, the show is filmed on the grounds of the Canadian Film Centre in Toronto during mid-summer, then premiered in November for season 1, and September for seasons 2 and 3, on CBC. The executive producer is Cathie James, and the series producers are Marike Emery (seasons 1 through 4) and Mark Ven de Ven (season 5).

Levy, a self-proclaimed "huge fan" of the British series upon which the show is based, stated that he "actively pursued" the hosting role for the premiere season.

CBC Television announced on February 7, 2018 that the series was renewed for a second season, and all hosts and judges would be returning. The series was renewed for a third season in 2019 with judge Bruno Feldeisen being joined by new judge Kyla Kennaley and new hosts Aurora Browne and Carolyn Taylor. The series was renewed for a fourth season due to air in 2020, but due to the COVID-19 pandemic, production was delayed and the season aired in early 2021, with new hosts Alan Shane Lewis and Ann Pornel. The fifth season aired in 2021 with the same hosts and judges.

Hosts and judges

Reception
John Doyle, reviewing the first episode for The Globe and Mail, called the show boring and said that it lacked "the major ingredients of eccentric flair and idiosyncratic contestants [of the original]." Doyle's criticism of host Dan Levy's "feyness" in the review was called homophobic by Levy and others. Eater Montreal writer Tim Forster said the show's first episode is "like somebody left the sugar out of the recipe: it looks right, but the flavour is kind of bland" due to a lack of focus on the contestants' stories, which he primarily attributed to poor editing and a rushed pace due to a shorter running time than the British series. Joanna Schneller called the judging by Bruno Feldeisen and Rochelle Adonis "consistently dull" in a review of the second episode for the Toronto Star. She suggested that, like the judges in the original series, they should be instructing on the significance of dishes as well as judging.

Greg David of TV, eh? called the show "unapologetically entertaining" and "a calming oasis amid the noisy negativity we're besieged with," specifically praising the chemistry of hosts Levy and Chan. Katherine DeClerq, reviewing the final episode in Women's Post, said she was "pleasantly surprised" by the series and "while the dry humour could be a bit dryer and the puns slightly less cheesy, I have to say I am in love with The Great Canadian Baking Show."

Season overview

{| class="wikitable"  style="text-align:center; line-height:16px;"
|-
! scope="col" | Season
! scope="col" | Episodes
! scope="col" | Premiere
! scope="col" | Finale
! style="background:silver;"|Runners-up
! style="background:gold;"|Winner
! scope="col"  |Average viewers(millions)
|-
! scope="row" rowspan="2" | 1
| rowspan="6" | 8
| rowspan="2" | 
| rowspan="2" | 
| rowspan="1" | Linda Longson
| rowspan="2" | Sabrina Degni
| rowspan="2" |1.4
|-
|Vandana Jain
|-
! rowspan="2" scope="row" | 2
| rowspan="2" | 
| rowspan="2" | 
| rowspan="1" | Sachin Seth
| rowspan="2" | Andrei Godoroja
| rowspan="2" | 1.4
|-
| Megan Stasiewich
|-
! scope="row" rowspan="2" | 3
| rowspan="2" | 
| rowspan="2" | 
| rowspan="1" | Colin Asuncion
| rowspan="2" | Nataliia Shevchenko
| rowspan="2" | 1.2
|-
|Jodi Robson
|-
! scope="row" rowspan="3" | Holiday (2019)
| rowspan="3" | 1
| rowspan="3" colspan="2" | 
| rowspan="1" | James Hoyland
| rowspan="3" | Timothy Fu
| rowspan="3" | 
|-
|Megan Stasiewich
|-
|Vandana Jain
|-
! scope="row" rowspan="2" | 4
| rowspan="2" | 8
| rowspan="2" | 
| rowspan="2" | 
| rowspan="1" |Tanner Davies
| rowspan="2" |Raufikat Oyawoye
| rowspan="2" |  
|-
|Mahathi Mundluru
|-
! scope="row" rowspan="2" | 5
| rowspan="2" | 8
| rowspan="2" | 
| rowspan="2" | 
| rowspan="1" |Aimee DeCruyenaere
| rowspan="2" |Vincent Chan
| rowspan="2" |  
|-
|Steve Levitt
|-
! scope="row" rowspan="3" | Holiday (2021)<ref>[https://gem.cbc.ca/media/the-great-canadian-baking-show/s05e09  The Great Canadian Holiday Baking Show]</ref>
| rowspan="3" | 1
| rowspan="3" colspan="2" | 
| rowspan="1" | Jodi Robson
| rowspan="3" | Sachin Seth
| rowspan="3" | 
|-
|Linda Longson
|-
|Colin Asuncion
|-
! scope="row" rowspan="2" | 6
| rowspan="2" | 8
| rowspan="2" | 
| rowspan="2" | 
| rowspan="1" | Chi Nguyễn 
| rowspan="2" | Lauren Tjoe
| rowspan="2" |  
|-
| Zoya Thawer
|-
! scope="row" rowspan="3" | Holiday (2022)
| rowspan="3" | 1
| rowspan="3" colspan="2" | 
| rowspan="1" | Mengling Chen
| rowspan="3" | Mahathi Mundluru
| rowspan="3" | 
|-
| Stephen Nhan
|-
| Steve Levitt
|-
|}

Season 1 (2017)

The inaugural season featured 10 bakers from across Canada competing over eight weeks. The season was won by Sabrina Degni of Montreal, Quebec. Runners-up were Vandana Jain (Regina, Saskatchewan) and Linda Longson (High River, Alberta).

Season 2 (2018)

Auditions for the second season were announced by CBC Television on February 7, 2018. The season began airing on September 19, 2018. The season was won by Andrei Godoroja of Vancouver, British Columbia. Runners-up were Sachin Seth (Halifax, Nova Scotia) and Megan Stasiewich (Leduc, Alberta).

Season 3 (2019)

Auditions for the third season were announced on January 24, 2019 with a release date of September 18, 2019. The winner of the season was Nataliia Shevchenko of Edmonton, Alberta. Runners-up were Colin Asuncion (Toronto, Ontario) and Jodi Robson (Regina, Saskatchewan).

The Great Canadian Holiday Baking Show (2019)

CBC announced a holiday special episode of The Great Canadian Baking Show on October 30, 2019 featuring four bakers from the competition's first two seasons: Season 1's Vandana Jain and James Hoyland alongside Season 2's Megan Stasiewich and Timothy Fu.

Season 4 (Winter 2021)

CBC announced auditions for the fourth season on April 17, 2020. Due to the ongoing COVID-19 pandemic, production (and thus the show's premiere) was delayed; as a result, the fourth season premiered on February 14, 2021. The season winner was Raufikat Oyawoye of Milton, Ontario. The runners-up were Tanner Davies (Winnipeg, Manitoba) and Mahathi Mundluru (Markham, Ontario).

Season 5 (Fall 2021)

On February 26, 2021, while Season 4 was still in progress, CBC announced auditions for the fifth season. Filming took place in June and July 2021, with the season premiering on October 17, 2021. The season winner was Vincent Chan of Missisauga, Ontario. Runners-up were Aimee DeCruyenaere (Ottawa, Ontario) and Steve Levitt (Aurora, Ontario).

The Great Canadian Holiday Baking Show (2021)

CBC announced a second holiday special episode of The Great Canadian Baking Show on November 18, 2021 featuring four bakers from the competition's previous seasons: Season 1's Linda Longson, Season 2's Sachin Seth, and Season 3's Colin Asuncion and Jodi Robson.

Season 6 (2022)

CBC announced auditions for the sixth season on January 21, 2022.  The sixth season premiered on CBC Television on October 2, 2022.  The season winner was Lauren Tjoe of Tsawwassen, British Columbia, with Chi Nguyễn (Toronto, Ontario) and Zoya Thawer (Edmonton, Alberta) as runners-up.

The Great Canadian Holiday Baking Show (2022)

CBC announced a third holiday special episode of The Great Canadian Baking Show'' on November 16, 2022 featuring four bakers from the competition's previous seasons: Season 2's Mengling Chen, Season 4's Mahathi Mundluru, and Season 5's Stephen Nhan and Steve Levitt.

References

External links
 
 

 
2010s Canadian reality television series
2017 Canadian television series debuts
English-language television shows
Television series by Proper Television
Television shows filmed in Toronto
CBC Television original programming
Canada
2010s Canadian cooking television series
Canadian television series based on British television series
Cooking competitions in Canada
2020s Canadian reality television series
2020s Canadian cooking television series